Cleveland shooting may refer to:

1933 Cleveland shootings, a spree shooting in 1933
Case Western Reserve University shooting, a school shooting in 2003
SuccessTech Academy shooting, a school shooting in 2007
Killing of Tamir Rice, the fatal shooting of an African American boy by Cleveland police in 2014
Shooting of Robert Godwin, a murder committed at random in 2017